#41 is a song by the Dave Matthews Band, featured on their 1996 album Crash.

Song history
#41 was originally written by Dave Matthews as a reply to lawsuits brought by Ross Hoffman, a former associate and manager of the band. Hoffman owned rights to a number of the band's songs in the early 1990s; however, due to creative differences, he was eventually fired by the band, and the band's present manager, Coran Capshaw, was hired. As an owner of the band's songs, Hoffman felt he deserved a share of the profits, which later caused a legal dispute between him and the band. Matthews wrote the song based upon the broken-hearted feelings he was experiencing as he was going through legal disputes with a former mentor of his.

On April 7, 1995, #41 debuted under the title "41 Police."  As the band had not come up with an official title for the song, the number 41 was used as it was the band's 41st song, and it sounded similar to a song by The Police, "Bring on the Night". The original performance was played at Cameron Indoor Stadium at Duke University, and lasted around nine minutes.  This version of the song was played a total of 19 times before evolving into the #41 that exists today.

In fall 1995, the song was officially named #41 after several lyric and chord changes were made. This song was the band's fourth "numbered" song at the time, following #27, #34, #36, and #40. After "41 Police" became a defunct song, the first performance of the #41 live was played on October 4, 1995, at the Tinker Street Café in Woodstock, NY.  The show featured frequent collaborator Tim Reynolds on the electric guitar. In the fall of 1995 the band, along with Reynolds, recorded the song in the studio for the album Crash with producer Steve Lillywhite. On the album, a flute bridge by LeRoi Moore segues the song into the following track, "Say Goodbye", and was often played in this fashion during live shows after the song's debut. During that year, #41 became the most played song on their summer tour.
  
In December 2000, lyrics from the band's song "Everyday", from the album of the same name, were added during the outro of the song, hence the creation of the "Everyday outro," which is often sung by Matthews during live performances.

Live collaborations
Throughout the years that the song has been performed live, the band has featured many guests to join them on stage and jam out the song, usually averaging around 15–20 minutes of play time, however sometimes longer.  On New Year's Eve 1996, the band featured guests Béla Fleck, Victor Wooten, Futureman and Jeff Coffin, who make up the  jazz fusion band, Béla Fleck and the Flecktones. During the live performance of #41, an interpolation of the Flecktones' song "Sojourn of Arjuna" was played live for the first time.  Interpolations of "Sojourn of Arjuna," featured on the Flecktones' album, Left of Cool, would be played during future live performances of #41 featuring guest appearances by Flecktones members. (This began to occur more frequently during the band's 2008 summer tour after longtime Flecktones member Jeff Coffin replaced the late LeRoi Moore as the band's saxophonist.)

Since the song's debut, Dave Matthews Band has played #41 live over 500 times, occasionally featuring the Flecktones as musical guests.  Currently, the longest live performance of #41 is also the band's longest performance of any song, and was played on April 20, 2002, at the former Corel Centre in Ottawa, Ontario, Canada.  The jam featured all of the Flecktones and lasted for 32 minutes and 3 seconds.  This performance was later released on the bonus disc for The Best of What's Around Vol. 1.

Official live releases
This is a complete list of albums which have featured #41 as a live track.

Live at Luther College
1996 acoustic show with Dave Matthews and Tim Reynolds
Listener Supported
1999 concert for PBS released as both a DVD and 2-CD set
The Warehouse 5
Only available to members of the Warehouse Fan Association
Featuring Butch Taylor, Béla Fleck, and Jeff Coffin
Live in Chicago 12.19.98
Winter 1998 concert
features guest Tim Reynolds, Victor Wooten.
The Gorge
Summer 2002 3-night stand (track available only on 6-disc special edition set from band's online store)
Live Trax Vol. 1
Winter 1998 concert
features guests Tim Reynolds, Béla Fleck, and Jeff Coffin
same performance featured on The Warehouse 5
Live Trax Vol. 2
2004 charity show
Live Trax Vol. 4
1996 Crash release show
Weekend on the Rocks
Summer 2005 4-night stand
features guest Rashawn Ross
The Best of What's Around Vol. 1 (Encore CD)
exclusive bonus disc for Warehouse club members who pre-ordered The Best of What's Around Vol. 1
features Béla Fleck and the Flecktones
official live recording of the #41 half-hour jam
Live Trax Vol. 7
Winter 1996 concert
features guests Béla Fleck and the Flecktones and Paul McCandless
Live Trax Vol. 8
8-7-2004 Alpine Valley Music Theatre, East Troy, WI
The song's 13th official release including Warehouse membership releases
Live Trax Vol. 10
Recent spring show in Lisbon, Portugal
features guest Tom Morello of Rage Against the Machine on acoustic guitar
Live at Radio City
2007 acoustic show with Dave Matthews and Tim Reynolds
Live Trax Vol. 11
Summer 2000 concert at Saratoga Performing Arts Center
Live at Mile High Music Festival
7-20-2008 Dick's Sporting Goods Park, Commerce City, Colorado
features Tim Reynolds on guitar and Jeff Coffin on saxophone
Live Trax Vol. 16
Summer 2000 concert
First of 2-night stand at Riverbend Music Center
Europe 2009
features Tim Reynolds on guitar and Jeff Coffin on saxophone
Includes an excerpt of "Sojourn of Arjuna"
Live Trax Vol. 17
Summer 1997 concert
Live Trax Vol. 18
Show opener

External links
DMB Almanac Listing
Guitar Tabs @ DMBTabs.com
Lyrics and Song History @ antsmarching.org

Dave Matthews Band songs
1996 songs
Songs written by Dave Matthews
Song recordings produced by Steve Lillywhite
Songs written by Stefan Lessard
Songs written by LeRoi Moore
Songs written by Carter Beauford
Songs written by Boyd Tinsley